Hybomitra hinei is a species of horse fly in the family Tabanidae.

Distribution
Canada, United States

References

Tabanidae
Insects described in 1904
Diptera of North America
Taxa named by Charles Willison Johnson